Kot Kapura is a historic city in Faridkot district, some 50 km from Bathinda, 40 km from Moga and 30 km from Muktsar in the state of Punjab, India. It is the largest city in the Faridkot District and has a large cotton market. It takes around 15 minutes by bus from Faridkot, 4 hours by road from Chandigarh and 2 hours from Ludhiana, and 8 hours from New Delhi by train to reach the city. It is a central city on route to Ganganagar, Ludhiana, Bathinda, Firozpur, etc. Kot Kapura takes its name from its founder, Nawab Kapur Singh, and the word 'Kot', meaning a small fort – literally the 'Fort of Kapura'. The city is known for its "Dhodha Sweet" and "Atta Chicken" both of which are exported outside India.

Kot Kapura, like many other small cities in India, is undergoing modernization. Shastri Market or Maheshwari Street established by Bansi Dhar Maheshwari (1875-1935) is one of the most populous and largest markets in Punjab. Kot Kapura has also been called the 'City of White Gold' due to its cotton market, which was once the largest cotton market in Asia. The city is famous for sweet called Dhodha and savoury dish named Atta Chicken.

Kot Kapura was famous for its ever-closed railway crossing gate on the Kot Kapura–Muktsar highway. However, a flyover has saved the town from this notorious landmark.

History
Bhallan Brar, founder of the Faridkot principality, was an ardent follower of Guru Har Gobind, the 6th Sikh Guru. He helped Guru Har Gobind Ji in the Battle of Mehraj, but died issueless in 1643. He was succeeded by his nephew, Kapura, who founded the town of Kot Kapura in 1661. Nawab Kapura was the chaudhry of eighty-four villages. Guru Gobind Singh, the 10th Guru of the Sikhs, en route from Machhiwara, after staying at Dina and after short stopovers at various other places, reached Kot Kapura and asked Nawab Kapura Brar for his fort to fight the pursuing Mughal army. Kapura was a Sikh, but did not want to earn the ire of the Mughals by helping Guru Gobind Singh openly in his war with them; otherwise, the famous last battle of Muktsar (Khidrane Di Dhaab; now a historic town) between Guru Gobind Singh and the Mughal army would have been fought at Kot Kapura. However, Nawab refused the fort to the guru. He was eventually hanged by Isa Khan Main, a Punjabi Muslim warlord.

Climate 
The climate of the Kotkapura is, on the whole, dry and is characterized by a very hot summer, a short rainy season, and a cold winters. The weather is generally dry but will be highly humid from mid May to end of August due to farmers irrigating the fields. There is no meteorological observatory in the district. Some rainfall occurs during the pre-monsoon months, mostly in the form of thunder-showers and in the cold season. The skies are mostly clear or lightly clouded during the whole year. Winds are generally light in the area, and are northerly to north-westerly, at times south-easterly, throughout the year. But, during the summer and monsoon seasons winds from directions between north-east and south-east blow on many days. The climate is mainly dry, characterized by a very hot summer, a short rainy season and a bracing winter.

Demographics  
The city is home to about 92 thousand people out of which 53% are Male and 47% are female.
Punjabi is the most widely spoken language in the city with some people speaking Hindi and its dialects.
Hindus contribute 52% of the total population and are the largest religious community followed by Sikhs which contribute 47% to the total population.
Literacy Rate of the city is around 77%

Environment and Health
A South African Board Certified Candidate Clinical Metal Toxicologist, Carin Smit, visiting Faridkot city in Punjab, India, instrumental in having hair and urine samples taken (2008/9) of 149/53 children respectively, who affected with birth abnormalities including physical deformities, neurological and mental disorders. These samples were shipped to Microtrace Mineral Lab, Germany.

At the onset of the action research project, it was expected that heavy metal / chemistry toxicity might be implicated as reasons why these children were so badly affected.  Surprisingly, high levels of uranium were found in 88% of the samples, and in the case of one child, the levels were more than 60 times the maximum safe limit.

A study, carried out amongst mentally retarded children in the Malwa region of Punjab, revealed 87% of children below 12 years and 82% beyond that age having uranium levels high enough to cause diseases, also uranium levels in samples of three kids from Kotkapura and Faridkot were  62, 44 and 27 times higher than normal.

An investigation carried out The Observer newspaper, in 2009, revealed the possible that cause of contamination of soil and ground water in Malwa region of Punjab, to be the fly ash from coal burnt at thermal power plants, which contains high levels of uranium and ash as the region has state's two biggest coal-fired power stations.

Unscientific farming practices, that emerged after the introduction of Green Revolution, are also alleged to be a reason for growing incidence of not just cancer but also, high rates of spontaneous abortions, reproductive ailments, genetic deformities, anaemia, diarrhoea, vomiting, fluorosis and a host of skin ailments including rashes and boils.

A 2007 epidemiological study found that the surface waters of Malwa region are contaminated with arsenic, cadmium, chromium, selenium and mercury primarily due to the discharge of untreated waste water from surrounding industries. With increasing poisoning of the soil, the region once hailed as the home to the Green revolution, now due to excessive use of chemical fertilizer, is being termed the "Other Bhopal", and "even credit-takers of the Revolution have begun to admit they had been wrong, now that they see wastelands and lives lost to farmer suicides in this 'granary of India'".

Transport

Railways 
Kotkapura Junction railway station serves the city as its Railway Station. It is connected with the cities of Bathinda, Ferozepur, Fazilka and Muktsar through railway lines. Many long route trains pass through Kotkapura on its way.

Roadways 
Kotkapura Bus Stand is hub for buses to the nearby cities. The Punjab Roadways (Punbus) and PRTC and other Private Companies buses connects this city to other major cities of Punjab like Amritsar, Chandigarh, Ludhiana, Jallandhar, Patiala, Bathinda among others.
 
Cycle rickshaw and E-Rickshaws are the major form of transport within the city. State Highway 16 which connects Moga and Malout passes through the city.

Air 
Sri Guru Ram Dass Jee International Airport in Amritsar and Bathinda domestic airport are the nearest, about 90 km away.

Education

Schools
City has major schools with boards Punjab School Education Board and Central Board of Secondary Education. Few schools also offers Indian Certificate of Secondary Education (ICSE) education. 

Major Schools includes DAV Public School and Dasmesh Public School which are some of the oldest schools in the city offering CBSE education. City also has separate Government schools for boys (Dr Hari Singh Sewak Sen. Sec. School)
and girls (Dr. Chanda Singh Marwah Govt. Sr. Sec. School), which provide sports facilities as well as education.

 Dr Hari SINGH Sewek Sen. Sec. School, Kotkapura
 Dasmesh Global School, Anand Nagar, Kotkapura
 West Point School, Sandhwan Danewala Road, Kotkapura
 Sada Ram Bansal Senior Secondary School, Jaitu Road, Kotkapura
 Rishi Senior Secondary School, Kotkapura
 Gandhi Model Senior Secondary School, Kotkapura
 Pristine Vibe School, Hira Singh Nagar, Kotkapura
 Ashoka Model Sen. Sec. School, Kotkapura
 Sunrise Kids School, Faridkot Road, Kotkapura
 Kidzee Preschool, Near Sangam Palace, Faridkot Road, Kot Kapura
 Dreamland Public School, Sikhan Wala Road, Kotkapura
 Laxmi Model Middle School, Near Old Fort, Kotkapura
 Guru Nanak Mission Senior Secondary School, Kotkapura.
 Dr. Chanda Singh Marwah Govt. Sen. Sec. School (Girls)
 D.C.M International School, BahmanWala Road, Kotkapura
 D.A.V Public School, Sikhawala Road, Kotkapura
 Dasmesh Public School, Partap Nagar, Kotkapura
 Gandhi Memorial High School, Kotkapura
 Oxbridge World School, Kotkapura
 Bhardwaj High School, Kotkapura
 Fable Public School, Jaitu Road, Kotkapura
 Satnam public School, Dwareana road, Kotkapura

Colleges
Colleges in the city offers education ranging from Nursing to Commerce and from Arts to Engineering.

Malwa College of Nursing is a reputed college in the state offering degrees in Nursing and acquires its name from Malwa region in Punjab.

 Shaheed Bhagat Singh Govt. College, Bathinda Road, Kotkapura
 Malwa College of Nursing.
 Malwa Degree College.
 Malwa Group of Institutions.
 Madav Kirpa Public College.
 Baba Farid Medical Institute for Nursing.
 Baba Farid College of Nursing.
 Baba Saikh Farid School of Nursing.
 Akal Sahaye College of Education.
 Baba Farid Institute Private ITI.
 Gurukul College for Women.
 Gurukul School of Nursing.
 Govt. Polytechnic College.
 Malwa College of Education.

Places To Visit
 Fun Plaza
 Durga Mandir
 Gurdwara Godavari Sar Patshahi
 Shiv Gufa Mandir
 Shri Radha Krishna Mandir
 Fort of Kot Kapura
 Gurudwara Patshahi Dasvin [Historical Gurudwara: Guru Gobind Singh Ji visited this place]
 Shri Guru Ravidas Mandir

References

Cities and towns in Faridkot district